Morgan Warburton (born April 27, 1987) is an American professional basketball player. She was drafted by the Sacramento Monarchs in the 2009 WNBA Draft. She was waived on June 4, 2009.

Playing career

High school
At Carbon High School, she earned all-state and all-region honors in basketball, volleyball and softball. She led her school to the state basketball championship in 2005 and paced the team in scoring for three seasons. Honors included being named Class 3A MVP in 2005.

Utah Utes
As a Sophomore, she started all 33 games and averaged 33 minutes per game, while playing in double-digit minutes each outing. Warburton averaged a team-best 15.8 points and led the team (ninth nationally) with an .882 free throw percentage. Against UNLV, Warburton had a double-double (19 points, 10 rebounds).

Heading into her junior year, Warburton was a starter in all 32 games, averaging over 33 minutes per game. She led the team, second in the MWC with 17.2 points per game and tallied double-digit scoring numbers in all 32 games, the longest streak in the conference. She was named honorable mention All-America by the Associated Press. On January 16, she became Utah's 20th 1,000-point scorer in a game against San Diego State on January 16.

In her senior year, Warburton was the preseason Mountain West Conference Player of the Year and a returning All-American. Entering the 2008–09 season, she was Utah's 20th 1,000-point scorer and a two-time all-conference player.

Sacramento Monarchs
She was selected in the 3rd round, 33rd overall in the 2009 WNBA Draft. Her WNBA exhibition debut was on May 21 in a 64–55 loss to the Seattle Storm. She played 11 minutes, had 2 field goals, 1 three-pointer, 2 rebounds, 1 block and 6 points.

European League
She played in Spain for Gran Canaria during the 2009–2010 season and Girona for the 2010–2011 season.

Career stats

Awards and honors
First-team All-Mountain West Conference, 2006–07
First-team All-Mountain West Conference, 2007–08
Led Mountain West Conference in free throw percentage (.861), 2007–08

Coaching career
In June 2011, Morgan joined the coaching staff at the University of Utah as Video Coordinator for the women's basketball team. In 2015, she became an assistant coach for the women's basketball team of Utah State University Eastern.

Personal
In May 2012, Morgan married Tyler Nelson and began using the surname Warburton-Nelson professionally.

References

1987 births
Living people
American women's basketball players
Basketball players from Utah
People from Price, Utah
Shooting guards
Utah Utes women's basketball coaches
Utah Utes women's basketball players
American women's basketball coaches